Krobia  is a town situated in the western part of Poland, in Greater Poland Voivodeship. Center of small folklore region - Biskupizna.

History

Within the Kingdom of Poland, Krobia was a private church town, administratively located in the Kościan County in the Poznań Voivodeship in the Greater Poland Province of the Polish Crown.

Following the joint German-Soviet invasion of Poland, which started World War II in September 1939, the town was occupied by Germany until 1945 and local Poles were subjected to various crimes. On October 21, 1939, the German Einsatzgruppe VI carried out a public execution of 15 Poles at the main square as part of the Intelligenzaktion. The victims were craftsmen and local officials from Krobia and farmers and landowners from nearby villages. It was one of many massacres of Poles committed by Germany on October 20–23 across the region in attempt to pacify and terrorize the Polish population. In December 1939, the first expulsion of 50 Poles (teachers, local officials and craftsmen with families) was carried out by the German police. Further expulsions were carried out in 1940. Expelled Poles were detained in transit camps in Gostyń and Łódź and then deported to Tarnów and the Lublin region in the General Government (German-occupied central Poland), while their houses were handed over to German colonists as part of the Lebensraum policy.

Monuments 
 Romanesque St. Giles church from the beginning of 12th century (consecrated in 1140), founded by Władysław I Herman, one of the oldest churches in Greater Poland
 Baroque St. Nicholas Church from 1763, tower rebuilt in 1986 after collapse
 Baroque Holy Spirit Church from 1745
 Town hall from the middle of 19th century
 old evangelical school

Sports
The local football club is Krobianka Krobia. It competes in the lower leagues.

References

External links 
 Official website

Cities and towns in Greater Poland Voivodeship
Gostyń County